Yoo Sung-Yeon (born 19 April 1976) is a Korean former judoka who competed in the 2000 Summer Olympics.

References

External links
 
 
 

1976 births
Living people
Olympic judoka of South Korea
Judoka at the 2000 Summer Olympics
Asian Games medalists in judo
Judoka at the 1998 Asian Games
South Korean male judoka
Universiade medalists in judo
Asian Games gold medalists for South Korea
Medalists at the 1998 Asian Games
Universiade bronze medalists for South Korea
20th-century South Korean people